Ahuroa is a locality in the Rodney District of New Zealand. Puhoi is to the south-east, Warkworth to the north-east, and Kaipara Flats to the north. The North Auckland railway line passes through the area.

Ahuroa and its surrounds in Meshblock 0146600 had a population of 132 people in 48 households in the 2013 New Zealand census.

The New Zealand Ministry for Culture and Heritage gives a translation of "Long Mound" for Ahuroa.

The North Auckland Line reached Ahuroa from Kaukapakapa in 1905, allowing exploitation of the local forests. Because it had a railway station, the road between Ahuroa and Glorit on the western coast was chosen to be a highway in the late 1920s, and metalled.

Ahuroa is also the site of King's College's Venture Camp. The school owns land and forests there and runs camps such as the 8 days stay as part of the 26 days Year 10 Adventure Challenge at Kings College and the Ahuroa venture camp hosts the Year 12 Leadership camp, preparing them to become prefects in Year 13, as well as leasing out the facility to many corporations from New Zealand.

Education

Notes

External links
 Ahuroa local website
 Ahuroa community website
 Ahuroa School website

Rodney Local Board Area
Populated places in the Auckland Region